Tetraselmis chuii is a marine unicellular alga.

External links 
aem.asm.org Gene sequence and expression of an analog of proliferating cell nuclear antigen (PCNA) in the alga Tetraselmis chui and detection of the encoded protein with anti-rat PCNA monoclonal antibody(pdf)

www.epopt.de An evaluation of the nutritional quality and nutrient uptake ability of Tetraselmis chui(pdf).

Chlorodendrophyceae
High lipid content microalgae